The Beauvoir estate, built in Biloxi, Mississippi, along the Gulf of Mexico, was the post-war home (1876–1889) of the former President of the  Confederate States of America, Jefferson Davis.  The house and plantation have been designated as a National Historic Landmark, recognized and listed by the U.S. Department of the Interior and its National Park Service.

The estate was purchased in 1873 by the planter Samuel Dorsey. After his death in 1875, his widow, Sarah Dorsey, learned that Davis was facing difficulties.  She invited him to visit at the plantation and offered him a cottage near the main house, where he could live and work at his memoirs. He ended up living there the rest of his life with his wife, Varina Howell Davis, and his youngest daughter, Varina Anne Davis (known as "Winnie").

Ill with cancer in 1878, Sarah Ellis Dorsey remade her will, bequeathing Beauvoir to Jefferson Davis and making Winnie the residuary legatee, inheriting after her father died. The three Davises lived at Beauvoir until former President Davis' death in 1889. Varina and Winnie moved to New York City in 1891.

After the death of Winnie in 1898, her mother, Varina Howell Davis, inherited the plantation. She sold it in 1902 to the Mississippi Division of the Sons of Confederate Veterans with the stipulation that it be used as a Confederate state veterans home and later as a memorial to her husband. Barracks were built nearby and the property was used as such a home until 1953, with the death of the last veteran of the Confederate States Army in Mississippi.

At that time, the main house was adapted as a house museum. In 1998, a library  was completed and opened on site.

Beauvoir survived Hurricane Camille in 1969. The main house and library were badly damaged, and other outbuildings were destroyed, during Hurricane Katrina on August 29, 2005. The house was restored and has been re-opened, while work continues on the library.

Description 
The name "Beauvoir" means "beautiful to view". The house was surrounded with cedars, oaks and magnolia trees, and at one time had an orange grove behind it. The home faces the Gulf of Mexico, and Spanish moss hangs from many of the large old trees on the property. Oyster Bayou, a freshwater impediment and bay-head swamp, once connected directly to the Mississippi Sound and runs across the property behind the main house from West to East. This body of water is fed by natural artesian springs on the grounds. The northeast portion of the estate is the site of a primitive, pre-urban hardwood forest with an environment similar to what existed in the area during the 1800s.

It is located across US Highway 90 from Biloxi Beach. The compound now consists of a Louisiana raised summer cottage-style residence, a botanical garden, a former Confederate veterans home, a modern gift shop, a Confederate Soldier Museum, the Jefferson Davis Presidential Library and Museum, various outbuildings, and a historic Confederate cemetery, which includes the Tomb of the Unknown Confederate Soldier. Five of seven of these buildings were destroyed in Hurricane Katrina, and replicas are being planned. Current proposals envision restoring Oyster Bayou to its original environmental state, although this area also suffered extensive damage from Hurricane Katrina.

History 

Beauvoir was built by James Brown, a planter and entrepreneur, in 1848 and was completed in 1852.  In 1873 the property was sold to Frank Johnston and soon thereafter to Samuel and Sarah Anne Ellis Dorsey.  They operated the plantation to cultivate cotton.  Sarah Dorsey was a novelist and historian, who wrote a biography of the Louisiana wartime governor, Henry Watkins Allen. It has been considered an important contribution to the Lost Cause literature.  Born and reared in Natchez, Mississippi, she was part of the prominent Percy family in the South.  After her husband, who was older, died in 1875, the widow Dorsey lived in the main house with her half-brother Mortimer Dahlgren.

In 1876, having heard of Jefferson Davis' financial and personal difficulties, Dorsey invited the former president to stay at Beauvoir.  She made a cottage available to him and assisted him in writing his memoir, The Rise and Fall of the Confederate Government (1881) by organizing, taking dictation and encouraging him.

Davis accepted Dorsey's invitation and moved into the cottage now known as the Library Pavilion on the plantation grounds in 1877. Later, his wife Varina joined him.

Davis arranged to purchase the property in 1879 for $5500 to be paid in three installments. In 1878, Dorsey had rewritten her will as she knew she was dying; she bequeathed the plantation to Davis and his daughter. Dorsey died in 1879.

Davis and Varina moved into the main house along with their youngest daughter, Winnie. She was single as they had refused to let her marry into the family of a Yankee abolitionist.  Davis lived in the home until his death in December 1889.  Varina Davis remained on the property for a time while she wrote her book Jefferson Davis: A Memoir (1890).  She and her daughter Winnie moved to New York City in 1891.

Dorsey had provided that, after Davis' death, Beauvoir would go to his daughter.  At her death in 1898, the property was inherited by Varina Howell Davis.  In 1902, she sold much of the property to the Mississippi Division of the Sons of Confederate Veterans (SCV), to be used as home for Confederate veterans and widows, and later as a memorial to her husband.  The SCV built a dozen barracks buildings, a hospital, and a chapel behind the main house.  From 1903 to 1957, approximately 2,500 veterans and their families lived at the home. Many veterans were buried in a cemetery on the property.

In 1941 the main house opened for public tours.  Eventually a Confederate Museum was opened on the site.  Over the next few decades, a Jefferson Davis Gallery, gift shop, the Tomb of the Unknown Confederate Soldier, and the Jefferson Davis Presidential Library and Museum were established on the grounds.

In 1969 the home survived Hurricane Camille.  It needed some repairs and restoration after flooding.

In 1998 the Mississippi Division of the Sons of Confederate Veterans opened the Jefferson Davis Presidential Library.  It contains the personal library and papers of Jefferson Davis, a biographical exhibit, and a theater and lecture hall.

Hurricane Katrina

Damage assessment

On August 29, 2005, the main building was severely damaged, losing its newly refurbished galleries (porches) and a section of its roof, but not destroyed by Hurricane Katrina, which hit the Biloxi-Gulfport area head-on. The Clarion-Ledger reported on August 31 that Beauvoir was “virtually demolished,” overstating the damage. The storm destroyed the Hayes Cottage, the Library Pavilion, a barracks replica, the Confederate Museum and the director's home.  The first floor of the Davis Presidential Library was gutted by the storm.  Approximately 35% of the collections were lost.

Although the extensive damage from Hurricane Katrina has required a massive restoration project for Beauvoir, the publicity caused detailed U.S. Government photos of the building to become widely available, revealing some architectural details and part of the internal structure of the original construction.

At the Beauvoir entranceway, above the door and left-side window, dentil molding appears along the lintel of the door and window. The internal construction of the building is also revealed, seen in exposed areas of the structure, such as the basement red-brick pillars, or the wooden wall frames, with wooden latticework backing the external plaster covering.  The external shell of Beauvoir was protected by six fireplaces that surround the core of the house. Of those six brick fireplaces reinforcing the outside walls, only one of six rooftop chimneys collapsed during the hurricane.  Five of the six fireplaces retained sufficient structural integrity to keep the walls of the building from falling away while under water.

On the back, west wing of Beauvoir, behind a front-yard tree, the green storm shutters survived the floating debris that battered the entrance.  The shutters protected the glass panes despite the 24-foot (8-m) storm surge that submerged the area.  Whole sections of the Beauvoir home have remained intact to preserve many of the original construction details and windows (as seen in the photograph excerpts, at right).

Restoration – buildings
Since thousands of homes in Mississippi were damaged or destroyed during Hurricane Katrina, construction work was diverted to all disaster areas of the state.  Restoration of Beauvoir proceeded slowly.  However, as it is a U.S. National Historic Landmark, Federal Emergency Management Agency (FEMA) officials approved Federal support to the repair and rebuilding of the Beauvoir complex.

With the financial assistance of various federal, state, private organizations and individual contributions, restoring Beauvoir Mansion started in early 2006. On June 3, 2008, also Jefferson Davis' 200th Birthday, Beauvoir Mansion had been fully restored and reopened for public tours. The mansion was restored to the original condition of when President and Varina Davis lived there.

In the winter of 2009, President Davis's personal library and the Hayes's cottage had been rebuilt and were open for public tours.

The new Jefferson Davis Presidential Library and Museum opened in June 2013. Many artifacts were recovered and were restored or repaired from the damage caused by Hurricane Katrina.

In addition to the Presidential Library, the historic kitchen, located behind the Beauvoir mansion, was reconstructed.

Funding for renovation included $17.2 million from state and federal sources.

Restoration – collections
About 60% of the collections are estimated to be salvageable. Prior to Katrina, the Jefferson Davis Presidential Library maintained a collection of 12,000 books on United States history, southern history, and history of the American Civil War.  The library also maintained collections of photographs, personal letters, manuscripts, envelopes, postcards, newspaper clippings, records of Confederate heritage organizations such as the United Confederate Veterans and the Sons of Confederate Veterans, and records from the Veterans home that once was present on the grounds. Most of these records survived, except for those on display in the two museums.

Civilian volunteers and the Mississippi Army National Guard assisted with salvage.  Unfortunately, the room storing much of the authentic china and artifacts was adjacent to the gift shop, with replicas of the originals.  Both rooms were destroyed, so sifting through the debris and identifying the genuine relics was very difficult.

Today
Beauvoir is owned and operated by the Mississippi Division of Sons of Confederate Veterans. Smithsonian magazine reported in 2018 that the museum communicates the Lost Cause perspective, including characterizing slavery as a positive institution and minor factor in the Civil War. It also reports that the State of Mississippi gives an annual grant of $100,000 for maintenance.

Activities

Before the destruction wrought by Hurricane Katrina, annual events included the Spring Pilgrimage in March, Confederate Memorial Day in April, the Fall Muster in October, and Candlelight Christmas in December. As of 2018, the Fall Muster is described as the "highlight" of the calendar.

Visitors to the site were presented with a biographical film on the life of Jefferson Davis narrated by an actor portraying Davis's long-time friend, Iowa Senator George Wallace Jones.

Designations 
The home and grounds are listed on the National Register of Historic Places.  Beauvoir was also designated as a National Historic Landmark and a Mississippi Historical Landmark.

References

External links 

 Official Beauvoir website
 
 
 
 New York Times: "In Mississippi, History Is Now a Salvage Job" – (Sept. 8, 2005).
 CNN: "Katrina uncovers a little history in Mississippi" – (August 28, 2010).

American Civil War museums in Mississippi
Antebellum architecture
Biographical museums in Mississippi
Buildings and structures in Biloxi, Mississippi
Confederate States of America monuments and memorials in Mississippi
Greek Revival houses in Mississippi
Historic house museums in Mississippi
Houses completed in 1848
Houses in Harrison County, Mississippi
Houses on the National Register of Historic Places in Mississippi
Jefferson Davis
Mississippi Landmarks
Museums in Harrison County, Mississippi
National Register of Historic Places in Harrison County, Mississippi
National Historic Landmarks in Mississippi
Old soldiers' homes in the United States
Sons of Confederate Veterans